is a passenger railway station in located in Sakai-ku, Sakai, Osaka Prefecture, Japan, operated by West Japan Railway Company (JR West).

Lines

Station layout
The station consists of two opposed side platforms connected by a footbridge. The station is staffed.

Platforms

History
It was renamed  in May 1938 and to its present name on 1 May 1944. With the privatization of the Japan National Railways (JNR) on 1 April 1987, the station came under the aegis of the West Japan Railway Company.

Station numbering was introduced in March 2018 with Mozu being assigned station number JR-R30.

Passenger statistics
In fiscal 2019, the station was used by an average of 3921 passengers daily (boarding passengers only).

Surrounding area
 Mozu Tombs
 Sakai City Museum

See also
List of railway stations in Japan

References

External links

 Mozu Station information 

Railway stations in Osaka Prefecture
Railway stations in Japan opened in 1929
Sakai, Osaka